Belebeyevsky District (Bashkir and , Bäläbäy rayonı; , Pelepey rayonĕ) is an administrative and municipal district (raion), one of the fifty-four in the Republic of Bashkortostan, Russia. It is located in the west of the republic and borders with Tuymazinsky and Buzdyaksky Districts in the north, Davlekanovsky District in the east, Alsheyevsky District in the southeast, Bizhbulyaksky District in the south, and with Yermekeyevsky District in the west. Its administrative center is the town of Belebey (which is not administratively a part of the district). As of the 2010 Census, the total population of the district was 41,708.

History
The district was established in 1930.

Administrative and municipal status
Within the framework of administrative divisions, Belebeyevsky District is one of the fifty-four in the Republic of Bashkortostan. It is divided into one settlement council (with the administrative center in the work settlement of Priyutovo) and fifteen selsoviets, which comprise eighty-eight rural localities. The town of Belebey serves as the administrative center of the district, despite being incorporated separately as a town of republic significance—an administrative unit with the status equal to that of the districts.

As a municipal division, the district is incorporated as Belebeyevsky Municipal District, with the town of republic significance of Belebey being incorporated within it as Belebey Urban Settlement. The settlement council is also incorporated as an urban settlement, and the fifteen selsoviets are incorporated as fifteen rural settlements within the municipal district. The town of Belebey serves as the administrative center of the municipal district as well.

References

Notes

Sources

Districts of Bashkortostan
States and territories established in 1930